The 2018 Open Castilla y León was a professional tennis tournament played on outdoor hard courts. It was the 33rd edition, for men, and 4th edition, for women, of the tournament and part of the 2018 ATP Challenger Tour and the 2018 ITF Women's Circuit. It took place in El Espinar, Segovia, Spain, between 30 July – 5 August 2018.

Men's singles main draw entrants

Seeds 

 1 Rankings as of 23 July 2018.

Other entrants 
The following players received wildcards into the singles main draw:
  Andrés Artuñedo
  Alejandro Davidovich Fokina
  Jorge Hernando Ruano
  Miguel Semmler

The following players received entry from the qualifying draw:
  Yannick Jankovits
  Lý Hoàng Nam
  Karim-Mohamed Maamoun
  Alberto Romero de Ávila Senise

The following player received entry as a lucky loser:
  Sadio Doumbia

Women's singles main draw entrants

Seeds 

 1 Rankings as of 23 July 2018.

Other entrants 
The following players received wildcards into the singles main draw:
  Ainhoa Atucha Gómez
  Lucía Cortez Llorca
  Ángela Díez Plágaro
  María Gutiérrez Carrasco

The following players received entry by special exempts:
  Cristina Bucșa
  Paula Ormaechea

The following players received entry from the qualifying draw:
  Irina Cantos Siemers
  Alba Carrillo Marín
  Tamara Čurović
  Mariana Dražić
  Mia Eklund
  Andrea Lázaro García
  Aleksandrina Naydenova
  Olga Parres Azcoitia

Champions

Men's singles

 Ugo Humbert def.  Adrián Menéndez Maceiras 6–3, 6–4.

Women's singles
 Liudmila Samsonova def.  Başak Eraydın, 6–2, 6–0

Men's doubles

 Andrés Artuñedo /  David Pérez Sanz def.  Matías Franco Descotte /  João Monteiro 6–7(3–7), 6–3, [10–6].

Women's doubles
 Marina Bassols Ribera /  Olga Parres Azcoitia def.  Tamara Čurović /  Başak Eraydın, 7–5, 6–4

External links 
 Official website

2018 ITF Women's Circuit
Open Castilla y León
2018 in Spanish tennis
July 2018 sports events in Spain
August 2018 sports events in Spain
Tennis tournaments in Spain
2018
2018 Open Castilla y León